Melissa María Manzanares López (born 26 September 1993) is a Nicaraguan footballer who plays as a defender for the Nicaragua women's national team.

Club career
Manzanares has played for Caruna RL in Nicaragua.

International career
Manzanares capped for Nicaragua at senior level during the 2010 Central American and Caribbean Games, the 2012 CONCACAF Women's Olympic Qualifying Tournament qualification and the 2013 Central American Games.

References 

1993 births
Living people
Nicaraguan women's footballers
Women's association football defenders
Nicaragua women's international footballers
Central American Games silver medalists for Nicaragua
Central American Games medalists in football